Kundol Lake also known as Kundol Dand, is a lake in Swat Valley, Khyber Pakhtunkhwa, Pakistan, which is located in the north of Utror valley at a distance of  away from Kalam. Similarly, there is a well known story about the lake which is that every night in a month, a golden bowl appears in the center of the lake and glistens like moon but no one has ever touched that bowl due to magical powers inside it.

Location & Trail to the lake

Kundol Lake lies in the lap of Hindu kush mountains at an elevation of (9,950 ft), in the north of Utror, encompassed by snow clad mountains and towering trees. Similarly, the trail to the lake from Ladu is easy to follow as a large stream flows down from the lake, which merges with River Swat in Kalam valley. It leads beside the stream and takes you to the lake. On the way, lush green forests, picturesque spots and gushing waterfalls welcome one's to the region. The mountains around the lake are covered by thick blanket of vegetation that enhances the beauty of the lake very much. The margins of Kundol lake serve as the camping site during the summer season for the trekkers.

Kundol lake is fed by melting glaciers and springs of the Mount Hindu kush. It gives rise to utror Khwar, the major right tributary of the Swat River.

Access
Kundol Lake is accessible only during the summer; during the winter, the roads are closed due to heavy snowfall. It can be accessed by an unpaved road from Kalam up to Utror in a four-wheel automotive where a link road ends in a green valley called Ladu in the foothills of the mountain.  From Ladu it takes almost four to six hours to reach the lake. The mountains around this small valley are covered with tall cedar and pine trees.

See also

Lake Saiful Muluk - Kaghan Valley
Dudipatsar Lake - Kaghan Valley
Katora Lake - Kumrat Valley
Mahodand Lake - Kalam Valley
Daral Lake - Swat Valley
List of lakes in Pakistan

References

Watch Kundol Lake Video on Youtube : https://www.youtube.com/watch?v=W7EsBwiXNIY

Lakes of Khyber Pakhtunkhwa
Tourist attractions in Swat
Swat District
Swat Kohistan